The Sondervick College is a Dutch catholic secondary school located in the village Veldhoven (province North Brabant). It provides all three levels of Dutch secondary education: VMBO, HAVO, VWO (and TTO meaning bilingual education at VWO-level).

The Dutch Secondary School System 

The Dutch system for secondary schools has been divided into three different levels of education:

 VMBO
Full name in Dutch: Voorbereidend Middelbaar Beroeps-Onderwijs
Literally meaning: Preparatory Secondary Vocational Education
Existing out of various directions; E.g. Construction & Technique, Welfare & Care, etc.
Practical approach
4 years

 HAVO
Full name in Dutch: Hoger Algemeen Voortgezet Onderwijs
Literally meaning: Higher General Secondary Education
Theoretical approach
5 years	

 VWO
Full name in Dutch: Voorbereidend Wetenschappelijk Onderwijs
Literally meaning: Preparatory Scientific Education (pre-university education)
Consisting of two directions: Gymnasium (includes the extra subjects Greek, Latin and Classical Culture) and Athenaeum (Consists of only the standard VWO-subjects, however does not include Greek, Latin or Classical Culture).
Theoretical approach
6 years

In the Netherlands children enter secondary school around the age of twelve and - depending on the level of education - graduate around the age of either sixteen, seventeen or eighteen.

Sondervick College provides education on all three of these levels.
In 2008 the school first started teaching TTO, meaning not just the regular Gymnasium and Athenaeum (where all subjects are taught in Dutch) can be followed, but also the bilingual variants (where in the first three years 65-70% of the subjects are taught in English instead of Dutch) can be followed.

Management

Head of school 

M. van Roosmalen

History

Old Locations 

The Sondervick College was founded in 1995 consisting of the following schools:
 The Anton van Duinkerkencollege for HAVO and VWO
 The Veldhof schoolcommunity for VBO and MAVO
 MAVO Koningshof
 MAVO Selsterhorst
 VSO De Stolberg

New Location 

In 2007 the school moved to its new location: The Kempen Campus, consisting of the six buildings A to F and the adjacent athletics track and sports fields.

The school is housed in the buildings A, D, E and F.
The HAVO and VWO education is housed in A.
The VMBO education is housed in E and F.
Building D is the central building (Used bij students of each level). It includes a big canteen, a stage for school events and special classrooms for subjects as music, drama, handicraft and art.

The buildings B and C house indoor sports facilities like a gym, fitness room and gymnastics hall. These buildings, as well as the athletics track and sports fields, are used by not only the school (for Physical Education) but also by various sports clubs.

External links 
 Official Sondervick College Website
 Official Kempen Campus Website

Educational institutions established in 1995
Christian schools in the Netherlands
Secondary schools in the Netherlands
Schools in North Brabant
Veldhoven
1995 establishments in the Netherlands